The women's 4 × 5 kilometre relay at the 1999 Asian Winter Games was held on February 3, 1999 at Yongpyong Cross Country Venue, South Korea.

Schedule
All times are Korea Standard Time (UTC+09:00)

Results

References

Results

External links
Results FIS

Women Relay